Philip Streczyk (25 November 1918 25 June 1958) was a technical sergeant in the 1st Infantry Division of the United States Army during World War II.

Biography
Streczyk was born to Polish parents Andrzej "Andrew" Streczyk (born 1876 in Austria-Hungary) and Marya (born 1886 in Austria-Hungary). Streczyk was a native of East Brunswick Township, New Jersey. He had nine siblings.

Streczyk quit school in eighth grade to help support his family, working as a truck driver until he was drafted into the U.S. Army in 1940 at the age of 21. Streczyk was able to speak Polish, and used this ability during D-Day.

D-Day
Streczyk is famous for being one of the first men off the beach at Omaha Beach.  He served in E Company, 2nd Battalion, 16th Infantry, 1st Infantry Division, under Lieutenant John M. Spalding.  He and his men helped make the breakthrough there on D-Day possible.  His platoon landed on the Easy Red sector, and made it to the seawall largely intact, unlike most in the first wave.  Instead of attacking up the beach exits, as was planned, he instead helped find and clear a path up the mined bluffs, left of Exit E-1.  Once at the top, he attacked the enemy fortifications from the rear, clearing out trenches and pillboxes along Exit E-1 and taking prisoners.  He was able to interrogate several of the Ost battalion POWs because he spoke fluent Polish, German, and English.  Later on D-Day, he was involved in actions further inland at Colleville-sur-Mer.

For his actions on D-Day, Streczyk was awarded the Distinguished Service Cross and Great Britain's Military Medal. His company commander later called him "the greatest unsung hero of World War II". He saw action in five other major battles during World War II with the Big Red One, including Tunisia, Sicily, and Hurtgen.  He was awarded the Silver Star four times.  His six theaters earned him six Bronze Stars.

One of Streczyk's children, Stanley Streczyk, told historian John C. McManus that he did not get along well with Lieutenant Spalding. Ron Streczyk told McManus that "After D-Day, during the Normandy fighting, one of Tech Sergeant Streczyk's men was severely wounded in a firefight. The stricken soldier's jaw was gone and he begged for death. The sergeant obliged and put him out of his misery. Later he felt guilty about it."

Subsequent World War II service 
Strezcyk continued to fight through Normandy, the Mons Pocket, Aachen, and finally the brutal Battle of Hürtgen Forest. In total, he logged 440 days of combat.

During the Battle of Hürtgen Forest, Streczyk reached a breaking point. He "shook uncontrollably and babbled incoherently" to the point where he had to be evacuated from the front lines with a suspected case of combat fatigue. His case was bad enough to where he needed to be evacuated to the United States Army General Hospital, Camp Butner, in the United States. In an interview with a journalist during his convalescence, he called his unit "The best platoon a man ever had". He was subsequently discharged from the U.S. Army. His Distinguished Service Cross was pinned onto him by General of the Army Dwight D. Eisenhower on 2 July 1944. Field Marshal Bernard L. Montgomery personally awarded him the British Military Medal about a week later.

Post-war life 
Streczyk became a builder in Florida.

He married Sophie Karanewsky and they had four children.

Streczyk had frequent nightmares and was in persistent pain from the physical and emotional wounds he sustained during his time in combat. This ultimately led to his suicide on 25 June 1958.  He was buried at the Church of Religious Science in East Brunswick, New Jersey.  The church is no longer active.  The cemetery is on private property and not easily accessible, but Philip, his brother John (US Navy WWII Veteran) and their father, Andrew are all buried there.

References

External links
 Commander's Interview at WarChronicle.com
 Son revives amazing lost story of Philip Streczyk, D-Day hero

United States Army personnel of World War II
People from East Brunswick, New Jersey
United States Army soldiers
Recipients of the Distinguished Service Cross (United States)
Recipients of the Military Medal
Recipients of the Silver Star
1918 births
1958 deaths